This list of tallest buildings in Chennai ranks high-rise and skyscraper buildings in Chennai, India based on official height. LIC Building in the city was the tallest highrise in India when it was inaugurated in 1959. Chennai is witnessing a huge high-rise boom with many highrises being built in different parts of the city. SPR City Highliving District at Perumbur is the tallest building in the city with a height of 172 metres (561 ft) tall and has 45 floors. The World Trade Center at Perungudi, the Houses of Hiranandani in Egattur, the TCS Signature Towers at Siruseri, the TVH Ouranya Bay at Padur, the LIC Building at Mount Road, Hyatt Regency Chennai at Teynampet and Arihant Majestic Towers at Koyambedu are some of the various prominent highrises in the city.

Despite being a port city and a major commercial center, Chennai does not have any supertall skyscrapers like other major cities in India due to the presence of weather radar placed in the city by the Indian government.

Background

Unlike other metropolitan cities in the country, Chennai continues to experience a horizontal growth (that is, expanding continuously in its area) rather than a vertical growth by means of building more skyscrapers, owing to the presence of weather radar at the Chennai Port, which prohibits construction of taller buildings beyond its permissible limits. The maximum permissible building height in Chennai was limited to 40 m until 1998, when it was increased to 60 m. This restriction continued until the second master plan of the Chennai Metropolitan Development Authority was rolled out in 2008, after which the restriction was lifted, allowing buildings taller than 60 meters to be built. Until then, the LIC Building on Anna Salai, with 15 floors, dominated the city's skyline. However, after the big companies started building tall concrete structures in the city, the skyline started changing, especially along the periphery, and more so in south Chennai along the Old Mahabalipuram Road, Egattur, Perumbakkam, and the East Coast Road. According to realty portal Commonfloor.com, as of 2014, there were 96 high-rises (buildings with 10 or more storeys) and 148 buildings under construction or planned.

Many more high-rises are already under construction in the city and dozens are proposed. However, the height of the buildings in the central business district has seldom gone beyond 20 floors. Almost 500 high-rises have already constructed in the city. Majority of the high-rises are residential.

Tallest buildings 

This lists ranks buildings in Chennai according to height.

Tallest buildings under construction

Buildings that are only approved or proposed are not included in this table.

Approved/Proposed

Timeline of tallest buildings of Chennai

See also

 Architecture of Chennai
 List of tallest buildings in India
 List of tallest buildings in Asia
 List of tallest buildings
 List of tallest buildings in different cities in India

References

Chennai-related lists
Buildings and structures in Chennai
Chennai
Lists of buildings and structures in Tamil Nadu